Piotr Basta (born 16 September 1970) is a Polish rower. He competed at the 1992 Summer Olympics, 1996 Summer Olympics and the 2000 Summer Olympics.

References

External links
 

1970 births
Living people
Polish male rowers
Olympic rowers of Poland
Rowers at the 1992 Summer Olympics
Rowers at the 1996 Summer Olympics
Rowers at the 2000 Summer Olympics
People from Krosno Odrzańskie